The 2016 Viterra Championship, Manitoba's provincial men's curling championship, was held from February 10 to 14 at the Selkirk Recreation Complex in Selkirk. The winning Mike McEwen team represented Manitoba at the 2016 Tim Hortons Brier in Ottawa.

Teams
Teams are as follows:

Draw
32 team double knockout with playoff round
Four teams qualify each from A Event and B Event

A Event

B Event

Playoffs

Playoff round
8 team double knockout
Four teams qualify into Championship Round

Championship Round

1 vs. 2
Saturday, February 13, 6:00 pm

3 vs. 4
Saturday, February 13, 6:00 pm

Semifinal
Sunday, February 14, 9:00 am

Final
Sunday, February 14, 2:00 pm

References

2016 Tim Hortons Brier
Sport in Selkirk, Manitoba
Curling in Manitoba
2016 in Manitoba
February 2016 sports events in Canada